Chen Wei is a Chinese artist famous for his photography work.

Biography
Chen Wei was born in 1980, in Zhejiang Province, China. Currently he lives and works in Beijing, China.

In his early career, he used to deal with experimental music and later turned to photography. Chen Wei's photographs are believed to express his inner thoughts and emotions. Most of his works are finished in his studio.

Chen has exhibited around the world, including Seoul Museum of Art, Museum of Art, Museum of Contemporary Art Shanghai, Pingyao International Photography Festival, Poznan Biennale, etc. Commissioned by fashion and art magazines such as FHM and LEAP, Chen has produces a few projects that bring together conceptual photography and fashion design, featuring products by Bottega Veneta, LV, and Prada, among others.

He was one of the artists involved in the exhibition called "A Plus" held by Lane Crawford and Modern Weekly, which aimed to gather together the top fashion designers and artists in China.

Chen Wei won the "Best Photography Artist" in Dead Rabbit Awards (2011) held by art magazine randian 燃点.

Selected exhibitions

Solo exhibition
2012

More, Leo Xu Projects, Shanghai, China

Rain In Some Areas， Galerie Rüdiger Schöttle, Munich, Germany

2011

Tight Rope, Yokohama CreativeCity Center, Yokohama, Japan

The Augur's Game, Galleria Glance, Turin, Italy

2010

Chen Wei: photography2006-2009, Full Art, Sevilla, Spain

House of Recovery, Platform China, Liste 15, Basel, Switzerland

2009

Chen Wei's Photography Works From 2007-2009, M97 Gallery, Shanghai, China

Everyday scenery and props, Gallery Exit, Hong Kong, China

2008

The Fabulist's Path, Platform China Contemporary Art Institute, Beijing, China

Group exhibitions

2016

Chinese Whispers, Zentrum Paul Klee, Bern, Switzerland

2014

"Control", Yang Xinguang and Chen Wei Group Show, Feizi Gallery, Brussels, Belgium

2013

Revel – Celebrating MoCA's 8 Years In Shanghai, Museum of Contemporary Art Shanghai, Shanghai, China

Shanghai Surprise: Contemporary Art In Shanghai Since 2000, Chi K11 Art Space, Shanghai, China

ON | OFF: China’s Young Artists in Concept and Practice, Ullens Center for Contemporary Art, Beijing, China

2012

Daily of Concept: A Practice of Life, Shanghai Duolun Museum of Modern Art, Shanghai, China

Cafam·Future, Cafa Art Museum, Beijing, China

Things Beyond Our Control, Fredric Snitzer Gallery, Miami, USA

2011

In The Heat of The Sun, Gallery Hyundai, Seoul, Korea

Sweet Dreams (Are Made of This), Leo Xu Projects, Shanghai, China

Catch The Moon In The Water, James Cohan Gallery, New York, U.S.A.

In a Perfect World，meulensteen，New York, U.S.A.

Parts and Whole, Hiromi Yoshii, Tokyo, Japan

2010

Alex: A Tribute to Alexander McQueen, James Cohan Gallery, Shanghai,China

Mark Flood, Agathe Snow and Chen Wei: Group Show, Rüdiger Schöttle Gallery, Munich, Germany

Jungle: A Close-Up Focus on Chinese Contemporary Art Trends, Platform China Contemporary Art Institute, Beijing, China

2009–2003

Seoul International Photography Festival 2009, Seoul, Korea

China Now-The Edge of Desire, Lillian Heidenberg Fine Art, Max Lang Gallery, New York, U.S.A.

New Work from China-Painting, Photography & Video, Fortune Cookie Projects Singapore, HT Contemporary Space, Singapore

Meditions Biennale 2008, Poznan, Poland

Unpredictable: Chen Wei and Jin Shan New Photography from China, Morono Kiang Gallery, Los Angeles, U.S.A.

Against the Wall: Contemporary Chinese Artists, Corkin Gallery, Toronto, ON, Canada

On View: Selections from China, curated by Fortune Cookie, Projects, Paul Morris Gallery, New York, U.S.A.

Shouting truth: A Contemporary Art Exhibition, Platform China Contemporary Art Institute, Beijing, China

Bai Ta Ling Exhibition of Contemporary Art, Bai Ta Ling, Hangzhou, China

References

External links
Chen Wei - personal website
Chen Wei's page at Leo Xy PROJECTS
Chen Wei's entry in Artlinkart
Modern Weekly

Chinese photographers
Artists from Zhejiang
1980 births
Living people